Ikauna is a town and nagar panchayat in the Shrawasti district in the Indian state of Uttar Pradesh. It is closely attached to the Shrawasti. There are five blocks in the Shrawasti district: Ikauna, Jamunha, Sirsiya, Gilaula, and Bhinga.

Geography
It has an average elevation of 109 metres (357 feet). It is near to Shrawasti (where Mahatma Gautam Buddha spent 11 years).

Educational institutes

There are several educational institutes in this district:

*Subhash Chandra Bose Inter College

*Moon And Sun Junior High school

Sunshine Public School, Bypass Road. Ikauna Shrawasti
Mahamaya Govt degree college
Jagat Jeet Inter College
Swami Vivekananda Inter college
Mahamaya Rajkiya Balika Inter College
Madarsa islamia furqania ahle sunnat ikauna

Demographics
, the census in India determined Ikauna had a population of 14,869.

References

External links
 Official Ikauna
 Join Ikauna on Facebook
 https://www.facebook.com/mif742ikauna/
 Join Shravasti 
 Vijay And Company

Cities and towns in Shravasti district